The following is a list of players who have played for the Catalans Dragons in one or more first team games (Super League or Challenge Cup) since the club joined the British rugby league system in 2006. Players are listed in order of debut and statistics are correct as of the end of the 2011 season.

Players

References
 
 

 
Catalans Dragons
Catalans Dragons players